"On My Own" is a duet by American singers Patti LaBelle and Michael McDonald. It was written and produced by Burt Bacharach and his then-wife Carole Bayer Sager and originally recorded by singer Dionne Warwick for inclusion on her album Friends (1985). The song was eventually recorded by LaBelle and McDonald for her eighth studio album, Winner in You (1986). It was released as the album's lead single on March 22, 1986, by MCA Records. Lyrically, "On My Own" was based on a relationship that had reached its end with both parties going their separate ways in a melancholy state with the occasional option of coming back together again one day.

The two performers were in separate cities when they recorded their individual parts which were then "married" during mixing. This was reflected in the music video produced to promote the song, which depicted LaBelle and McDonald performing the song simultaneously on different coasts. The singers were shown on separate sides of a split screen, each singing the song while walking through apartments which had identical layouts but different decor and furniture. The views from their respective porches, where they finished the song, made clear their separation by the continent.

Commercial performance
"On My Own" became the most successful single ever for both singers as it reached number one on the Billboard Hot 100 for three weeks. The song also reached the number-one spot on the Hot Black Singles chart (for four weeks) and number two on the Hot Adult Contemporary chart. In the United Kingdom, the song peaked at number two on the UK Singles Chart and has been certified gold by the British Phonographic Industry (BPI), becoming the 22nd best-selling single of 1986 in the country. The song was initially not intended to be a duet at all, but LaBelle decided to invite McDonald to help her turn the song into a duet, as she stated: "The song was sent to me and I did a version of it but somehow it just didn't quite work. We were going over things I'd done and we talked about turning it into a duet. Someone asked, 'If you could do it with anyone, who would you sing it with?', and Michael was my first choice."

Charts

Weekly charts

Year-end charts

All-time charts

Certifications

Reba McEntire version

In September 1995, country entertainer Reba McEntire released a cover version of the song as the first single from her album Starting Over. Her version, featuring guest vocals from Martina McBride, Linda Davis and Trisha Yearwood, peaked at number 20 on Hot Country Singles & Tracks chart, although only McEntire received chart credit for it. Its music video was directed by Dominic Orlando and was filmed on the Chaplin Stage.

The four artists performed the song at the 1995 Country Music Association Awards, and again at the 1996 Academy of Country Music Awards.

Charts

References

External links
 

1980s ballads
1986 singles
1986 songs
1995 singles
Billboard Hot 100 number-one singles
Cashbox number-one singles
Contemporary R&B ballads
Dionne Warwick songs
Irish Singles Chart number-one singles
Male–female vocal duets
MCA Records singles
MCA Nashville Records singles
Michael McDonald (musician) songs
Patti LaBelle songs
Pop ballads
Reba McEntire songs
RPM Top Singles number-one singles
Song recordings produced by Tony Brown (record producer)
Songs about heartache
Songs about loneliness
Songs with music by Burt Bacharach
Songs written by Carole Bayer Sager
Vocal collaborations